Uncle Ruckus (born July 4, 1939) is a fictional character on the American animated sitcom The Boondocks. Voiced by Gary Anthony Williams, he first appeared on television in the show's pilot, "The Garden Party", on November 6, 2005. Created and designed by cartoonist Aaron McGruder, Ruckus enjoyed great success after appearing in the comic strip of the same name.

Ruckus had a turbulent childhood as he was raised by the abusive Mister Ruckus. His mother had a self-identity crisis, often praising white people. After being kicked out of his home as a teenager, he traveled to Woodcrest, where he works odd jobs. Ruckus embodies many old American working-class stereotypes: he is crude, short-tempered, obese, rule-neglecting, clumsy, and largely ignorant. He is not good at many things and sometimes considered to be good-for-nothing in general. He is also internally racist, repeatedly proclaiming his love for the white race and disdain of the black race, and he even identifies as Caucasian, saying he suffers from "reverse vitiligo".

Despite this, Ruckus maintains a close relationship with Robert Freeman and yearns for social acceptance. Despite the blue-collar routine of his life, he has had a number of remarkable experiences, including work as a recording artist.

Personality 

He has an intense hatred of anything pertaining to African Americans and goes out of his way to distance himself from black people, especially those of previous generations. Ruckus claims God says the path to forgiveness for being black is to rebuke one's own race. He has a mismatched glass eye due to the beatings he received from his father. Ruckus champions the giant traces of Irish ancestry he claims to have, though a DNA test shows he is "102% African with a 2% margin of error”.

Although Ruckus had a terrible father, the main cause for his personality and view of the world is his mother. Though his mother loved him deeply, she was an extremely deluded and damaged woman who, despite a lifetime of abuse and poor decisions, was convinced that her life would have been better if she had been born white. As a result, Ruckus wishes that all black people were still enslaved or never existed at all. He frequently introduces himself as "Uncle Ruckus, no relation," to indicate that he has no familial connection to the people he is addressing (and because his first name is literally Uncle).

Ruckus prattles white supremacist rhetoric and calls Michael Jackson (who suffered from the pigmentational skin changing disorder vitiligo) a "lucky bastard" as he doesn't look black. Ruckus claims that he himself has "re-vitiligo", to explain his own skin tone. Ruckus applies a homemade topical ointment of "bleach and sulfur" in order to treat his self-diagnosed condition, stating that he "likes to think it works" and that it has prevented him from "getting any darker these past few years."

According to a flashback, in his early 20s (20 years old in 1959) he protested against Martin Luther King Jr.'s marches during the civil rights movement and would occasionally throw bricks at King. Another flashback scene shows Ruckus serving on a Tennessee jury in 1957 (making him a minimum of 70 years old in 2009, although this flashback is not consistent with the show's continuity) that helped convict a blind black man of killing three white girls. In spite of being blind, the African American man supposedly shot the three with a Winchester rifle from about 50 yards away. Ruckus is the only black person on the otherwise all-white jury in a Jim Crow courtroom. During his first encounter with the Freeman family, Ruckus sings "Don't Trust Them New Niggas Over There" in the pilot episode, though he socializes freely with the Freemans thereafter.

Ruckus constantly hurls hateful racist invective at all things black. On being asked if he supports the use of the word "nigga", Ruckus says: 
No, I don't think we should use the word, and I'll tell ya why. Because niggas have gotten used to it, that's why. Hell, they like it now. It's like when you growin' crops and you strip the soil of its nutrients and goodness and then you can't grow nothin'. You gotta rotate your racist slurs. Now I know it's hard 'cause 'nigga' just rolls off the tongue the way sweat rolls off a nigga's forehead, but we cannot let that be a crutch. Especially when there are so many fine substitutes: spade, porch monkey, jiggaboo. I say the next time you gonna call a darkie a nigga, you call that coon a jungle bunny instead.

Jobs and lifestyle 
Ruckus worships white society and culture, which explains why he lives in Woodcrest. Ruckus claims to like the smell of white people, saying they smell like "lemon juice and Pledge furniture cleaner". Despite Woodcrest's newfound acceptance of different ethnicities, the neighborhood apparently has no quarrel with Uncle Ruckus' racist beliefs. Ruckus can be seen employed in a variety of places performing a number of blue-collar jobs. However, that does not mean that all members of that community agree with his outbursts of racist remarks. Rather they tend to ignore them due to his constant racist profiling.

At one point Ruckus joined the police force after turning down a 7-figure settlement for being wrongfully shot at 118 times, claiming that the officers "were simply doing their job." Even after he becomes an officer, they still beat him on the pretext that "He has a gun." As an officer, he promises to make every black man's life as miserable as he possibly can ("The Block is Hot"). Ruckus also becomes an evangelist after dreaming of going to "White Heaven", preaching that black people must hate their blackness and love the white man to receive entrance into heaven ("The Passion of Reverend Ruckus").

The beginning of this episode is also one of the few moments of the series in which Uncle Ruckus admits, or even suggests, that he is or might be black. The episode starts with Ruckus knocking on Robert's front door with the news that he has been diagnosed with cancer. He proceeds to attempt to describe the specific type of cancer he has been diagnosed with in Latin, which is one made up for the show, but he fails to do so, stating: "[...] or some other big word my small negro brain and big lips can't pronounce." Although, he might have been using his "condition" to get some pity out of the Freeman family.

Ruckus has held a vast variety of jobs over the course of the series (car parking valet, police officer, maitre d', movie theater usher, exorcist, etc.) at many of its business establishments. In the banned episode "Uncle Ruckus' Reality Show", he claims to have 32 jobs over the course of the week, so he needs to wake at 4:45 a.m. every morning. Despite holding so many jobs, Ruckus continues to live in a dilapidated home and drive a beaten-up truck.

Although over 70 years old and obese, Ruckus has been shown to be strong enough to pull a car door off its hinges with ease and is an advanced practitioner of martial arts. He has shown himself to be Huey's equal on multiple occasions. His mastery with nunchaku surpasses even Huey's and he is capable of incredible acrobatics. In the series' second season (first heard in "...Or Die Trying"), a sound-alike variation on the tuba piece "Jabba's Theme" (from Return of the Jedi) is used as a musical theme for Ruckus, drawing a parallel between the Star Wars character and the similarly repellent Ruckus.

In the episode "The Story of Jimmy Rebel", Ruckus records racist songs and sends them to his idol, Jimmy Rebel, a racist songwriter who lives in Spokenhoke, Texas; this character is based on real singer/songwriter Johnny Rebel. Jimmy Rebel and R.R (Racist Records) loves the songs so much that Rebel heads down to meet Ruckus. Although Ruckus is a black man, Jimmy puts this aside. He spends two days with Toby (the false identity Ruckus made up to talk with Rebel) and brings him to Spokenhoke to record songs with him.

So far, the only episode in which Ruckus does not display any animosity toward blacks is in the episode "The Story of Gangstalicious Part 2".

In the episode "The Color Ruckus", it is revealed that Ruckus's mother told him he was adopted and had white heritage. She also invented the disease re-vitiligo and told Ruckus that it alone was the reason he is physically indistinguishable from a normal black person. In spite of this, his father harshly claimed these explanations were lies meant to protect Ruckus' self-esteem, telling his son that he was "just another black nigga like the rest of us." Ruckus refused to believe his father's words and his mother continued to lie about his heritage.

Relationships

Robert Freeman
Robert Freeman is the closest thing to a friend that Uncle Ruckus has, though Robert rebukes Ruckus' racist notions. For example, a friendly match of checkers between them ends bitterly after Ruckus makes supremacist remarks. Ruckus is supportive of Freeman during his training for a rematch with Col. Stinkmeaner and is the only one besides Riley who praises him when he fights and kills Stinkmeaner (in the episode "Granddad's Fight").

Despite all this, Ruckus claims their friendship is a pretense ("The Trial of R. Kelly") and that he still sees him as a "nigga." In the episode "The Real," Ruckus is also one of the "homeless people" that Robert "houses," the other being Jazmine Dubois.

Huey and Riley Freeman
Uncle Ruckus says in "...Or Die Trying" that he has despised Huey ever since the Freemans' arrival in Woodcrest. For Huey's part, he seems to ignore Uncle Ruckus' racist rantings, knowing that debating with the man will do little good. However, when Ruckus challenges him to a martial arts showdown, Huey fights him twice - first with a push-broom handle as a staff and later unarmed.

Neither fight is shown in its entirety. Huey is seen sitting in the theater manager's office after the first one and the episode ends in a freeze-frame as the second one begins. Both fights appear to be references to the Japanese manga series Fist of the North Star. Ruckus often gets angry at Riley for being a hoodlum, which regularly leads to fights.

Dubois family
Ruckus tolerates the Dubois, largely due to Sarah's presence, since she is white. He believes that Tom is lucky to have Sarah and that she is with him out of pity rather than love (even postulating at one point that she taught him how to read). He does not think much of Jazmine due to her half-black status, pejoratively calling her a "mulatto" and a "little half and half." In a moment of relative kindness, he refers to her as a "nice little mixed-breed girl."

However, he does seem to hold her superior to a black child, once stating that she is smarter than Riley. In a rare moment, he manages to single-handedly restore her faith in Christmas and in Santa Claus, effectively ending her crying and cheering her up ("A Huey Freeman Christmas").

Film 
McGruder launched a Kickstarter campaign with the aim of raising $200,000 in order to produce a film focusing on Ruckus. The fundraiser, from January 30, 2013, till March 1, 2013, obtained pledges of $129,963. He stated that crowd-funding would be the sole source of funding for the film's budget. The David Brothers of Comics Alliance expressed concern that a film about the character might not be effective as a racial comedy outside the context of The Boondocks.

References 

The Boondocks characters
Animated human characters
Villains in animated television series
Black characters in animation
Black people in comics
Comics characters introduced in 2004
Fictional activists
Fictional African-American people
Fictional American municipal police officers
Fictional American politicians
Fictional American prison officers and governors
Fictional businesspeople
Fictional characters from Maryland
Fictional characters with psychiatric disorders
Fictional Christians
Fictional cult leaders
Fictional exorcists
Fictional horticulturists and gardeners
Fictional janitors
Fictional male domestic workers
Fictional male martial artists
Fictional nunchakuka
Fictional police officers in television
Fictional priests and priestesses
Fictional Republicans (United States)
Fictional servants
Fictional victims of domestic abuse
Male characters in animated series
Male characters in comics
Male villains
Martial artist characters in television
Racism in television